The Mata Preta Ecological Station is an ecological station in the state of Santa Catarina, Brazil. It preserves fragments of Atlantic Forest vegetation, including endangered plant and animal species.

Location

The Mata Preta Ecological Station (ESEC) is in the municipality of Abelardo Luz, Santa Catarina.
The ESEC lies just south of the border with the state of Paraná.
It is along the south of the section of the BR-280 highway between Clevelândia and Palmas, in three separate sections.
The SC-155 highway divides the eastern section from the central section.

History

The Mata Preta Ecological Station was created on 19 October 2005.
The process was very confrontational, with strong opposition from the landowners.
The consultative council was created on 1 September 2010.
As of 2016 the legal status was still not finalized and the owners of land in the ESEC had not been compensated.
No field studies had been undertaken and there was no management plan.

The ESEC is classed as IUCN protected area category Ia (strict nature reserve).
It has the objectives of conserving nature and supporting scientific research.
It is administered by the Chico Mendes Institute for Biodiversity Conservation (ICMBio).

Environment

The terrain is hilly, cut by small watercourses that feed the Chapecó River in the Uruguay River basin.

The ESEC is in the Atlantic Forest biome.
Vegetation is mainly mixed rainforest.
The three sections of forest are in different stages of regeneration.
One of them is well-preserved and holds an immense stand of Araucaria angustifolia, with tree species in the under story typical of the primary forest formation such as Ocotea porosa, Sloanea lasiocoma and Ilex paraguariensis.
The other two fragments show the impact of human activity, with clearings in which there are different stages of succession growth.
However, they contain rare and endangered tree species.

Important tree species include Dicksonia sellowiana, Parapiptadenia rigida, Cordia trichotoma, Ocotea pulchella, Nectandra lanceolata, Cedrela fissilis, Psychotria leiocarpa and Aechmea recurvata.
Protected mammal and bird species include the ocelot (Leopardus pardalis), oncilla (Leopardus tigrinus), colocolo (Leopardus colocolo), cougar (Puma concolor), pygmy brocket (Mazama nana) and vinaceous-breasted amazon (Amazona vinacea).

The buffer zone contains small agricultural settlements, small and large farms and large pine plantations.
There are huge fields of soy beans, wheat and corn.
The region is under intense pressure from logging and agriculture.
Apart from fragmentation, the ESEC is threatened by hunting, fires in the buffer zone fields in late winter, abandoned domestic animals, capture of wild animals for breeding in captivity and invasive exotic species.

Notes

Sources

2005 establishments in Brazil
Protected areas of Santa Catarina (state)
Ecological stations of Brazil
Protected areas established in 2005
Protected areas of the Atlantic Forest